Irus irus is a species of bivalve belonging to the family Veneridae.

The species is found in Old World.

References

Veneridae